SpareBank 1 BV was a Norwegian savings bank, headquartered in Sandefjord, Norway. The banks main market
was Buskerud and Vestfold. The banks history can be traced back to 1883 with the establishment of
Sandsvær Sparebank.

Sparebank 1 BV was merged with Sparebank 1 Telemark on 1 June 2021.</ref>

References

SpareBank 1
Banks of Norway
Companies based in Sandefjord
Banks established in 2008
Companies listed on the Oslo Stock Exchange